Marc Savoy (born October 1, 1940) is an American musician, and builder and player of the Cajun accordion.

Early life
He was born on his grandfather's rice farm near Eunice, Louisiana. His grandfather was a fiddler, who occasionally played with the legendary Dennis McGee, who was once a tenant farmer on his grandfather's property. Marc Savoy began playing traditional music when he was 12 years old.

Career
Savoy holds a degree in chemical engineering but his primary income is derived from his accordion-making business, based at his Savoy Music Center in Eunice. His wife is the singer and guitarist Ann Savoy, whom he met in 1975 and married in 1977. He has performed with Robert Bertrand, Dennis McGee, Rodney Balfa, Sady Courville, Dewey Balfa, D. L. Menard, and Michael Doucet, the latter of whom he plays with in the Savoy-Doucet Band. He also plays in the Savoy Family Band with his wife Ann and their sons Joel and Wilson.

He hosts regular jam sessions and mini-festivals at the Savoy Music Center.

Awards and honors
Savoy is a recipient of a 1992 National Heritage Fellowship awarded by the National Endowment for the Arts, which is the United States government's highest honor in the folk and traditional arts.

Discography (albums)

As Marc Savoy 
 1976 : Under a Green Oak Tree (with Dewey Balfa and D.L. Menard) (Arhoolie Records) 
 1981 : Oh What a Night (Arhoolie)
 1998 : Made in Louisiana (Voyager)

Savoy-Doucet Cajun Band 
 1983 : Home Music (K7, Arhoolie)
 1987 : With Spirits (K7, Arhoolie)
 1989 : Two-Step d'Amede (Arhoolie)
 1992 : Home Music with Spirits (Arhoolie)
 1994 : Live! At the Dance (Arhoolie)
 2002 : The Best of the Savoy-Doucet Cajun Band compilation (Arhoolie)

Savoy Family Band 
See Savoy Family Band

Savoy-Smith Cajun Band 
 1996 : Now and Then (Arhoolie)

Films
1972 - Spend It All 
1981 - Southern Comfort. Directed by Walter Hill.
1989 - J'ai Ete Au Bal (I Went To The Dance). Directed by Les Blank. 
1990 - Yum Yum Yum! A Taste Of Cajun And Creole Cooking. Directed by Les Blank. 
1991 - Marc & Ann. Directed by Les Blank.

See also
History of Cajun music
List of people related to Cajun music

References

External links

 
. Barry Jean Ancelet, Meloche.net
 at Rootsworld

1940 births
Living people
Cajun accordionists
People from Eunice, Louisiana
National Heritage Fellowship winners
20th-century American musicians
Musicians from Louisiana
21st-century accordionists
Arhoolie Records artists